Pwedeng Pwede (also known as Puwedeng Puwede) (English: You can or Absolutely Alright) is a Philippine comedy sitcom on ABS-CBN which aired from September 8, 1999 to October 16, 2001.

Cast
 Robin Padilla as Carding
 Redford White † as Bruce
 Ogie Diaz as Charlotte
 Vhong Navarro as  Samson
 Nida Blanca † as Kaycee
 Kris Aquino as Chedy
 Palito † as Tarzing
 Vanessa del Bianco as Samba
 Marissa Sanchez as Cha-Cha
 Katrina Nazario as Jamie
 Aljon Valdenibro as Jep-Jep

Tonight's guests
Claudine Barretto
Archie Adamos
Jaime Fabregas
Manilyn Reynes
Kier Legaspi
Jinky Oda
Celia Rodriguez

See also
 List of shows previously aired by ABS-CBN

External links
 

ABS-CBN original programming
Philippine television sitcoms
1999 Philippine television series debuts
2001 Philippine television series endings
Filipino-language television shows